While some protests of the anti-abortion movement use violent methods, most protesters use a range of physically non-violent tactics, which may nonetheless include emotionally violent acts, such as intimidation or harassment.

Tactics

Prayer 
Praying outside of abortion providers is one of the most common tactics employed by abortion protestors. Protestors take a place outside of clinics, generally in groups, and pray silently or out loud for the women who are accessing abortion services and their fetuses. In many cases, those praying do not interact with the people entering the clinic, though the tactic may nonetheless serve to intimidate and shame the patients at the clinics.

Sidewalk counseling 

Sidewalk counseling or sidewalk interference is a common tactic employed by anti-abortion protestors, who stand outside or near clinic entrances and attempt to convince patients entering not to complete the procedure. This may involve offering information about alternatives to terminating a pregnancy (such as adoption), community resources, and information about fetal development. The frequency with which clinics are occupied by sidewalk counselors varies widely among clinics and on a state-by-state basis. Joseph Scheidler, author of Closed: 99 Ways to Stop Abortion about anti-abortion protesting, endorses sidewalk counselling as the most effective form of anti-abortion protesting. 

While counselors claim to be peaceful and simply offering help to patients, some academics have referred to these counseling tactics as intimidation, rather than as a form of persuasion.

Legal restrictions against intimidation tactics 
Following the assassination of Dr. David Gunn and the record number of violent clinic protests and blockades that followed, Congress passed the Freedom of Access to Clinic Entrances (FACE) Act, signed into law by President Clinton in May 1994. FACE makes it a federal crime to use force, the threat of force, or physical obstruction to prevent women from seeking, obtaining, or providing reproductive health services.

A few states and municipalities have also enacted legal restrictions against intimidation tactics by anti-abortion protestors. The two main types of legal restrictions are buffer zone laws and bubble zone laws. Buffer zone laws limit how close demonstrators are permitted to get a facility. Bubble zone laws create floating areas around specific people (like clinic staff and their patients), and prohibit protestors from coming within a certain distance of them.

By state 
Colorado:  A 1999 statute passed by the Colorado state legislature creates a 100-foot buffer zone around a clinic and an 8 foot floating bubble zone around any person entering the clinic. The law prohibits any person outside those boundaries from engaging in oral protests, passing a leaflet, or displaying a sign to another person without their consent. This statute was the first law placing restrictions on non-violent forms of anti-abortion protest.

Montana: In 2005, the Montana state legislature passed HB 324, which established a 36-foot buffer zone around reproductive health clinics and prevents protestors from coming within eight feet of anyone entering or leaving healthcare facility.

Massachusetts: In 2007, the Massachusetts state legislature passed a bill that would create a 35-foot buffer zone around entrances, exits, and driveways of abortion clinics. The law does not include a floating buffer zone provision. The goal of the legislation was to "prevent interference with patients' ability to access clinics and to protect them from being lectured, abused, or harassed by anti-choice activists."

Legal challenges to restrictions on anti-abortion protestors 

Some of these laws have been challenged on the grounds that they are restrictions on protestors' First Amendment right to free speech and free assembly.

Hill v. Colorado 

Colorado's buffer law statute was the first to be challenged in the courts. This first challenge was petitioned by Leila Hill and a group of sidewalk counselors who claimed that the law violated their First Amendment right to free speech. The district judge dismissed the case, citing Ward v. Rock Against Racism in its ruling that the buffer law established that the government could implement laws that imposed content-neutral time, place, and manner restrictions designed to serve a significant government interest.

The case eventually reached the US Supreme Court. In a 6–3 decision, the Court ruled that law's regulations on speech-related conduct are constitutional. Writing for the majority, Justice John Paul Stevens argued that the statute "is not a regulation of speech. Rather, it is a regulation of the place where some speech may occur." He continued that while the statute prohibits speakers from approaching unwilling listeners, it does not require a speaker to move away from a passer-by, or place a restriction on the content of a message. The law simply makes it more difficult to offer unwanted advice to persons entering or leaving medical facilities, and adequately balances the need to protect medical patients from unwanted communication, with the need to leave open sufficient channels of communication for protestors. 

Writing in dissent, Antonin Scalia argued that demonstrators "don’t want to protest abortion. They want to talk to the women who are about to get abortions and try to talk them out of it. I think it distorts it to say that what they want to do is protest abortion." He argued that, since the conversations are consensual and simply attempt to offer guidance, the law is an unconstitutional restriction on the First Amendment.

McCullen v. Coakley 

In 2007, Eleanor McCullen, a member of Operation Rescue, filed a lawsuit against the Commonwealth of Massachusetts citing that the state's buffer zone law was a violation of the First Amendment protection of free speech. The federal district court held that while the law placed a restriction on the time, place, and manner of the speech, the law was constitutional "because it was content-neutral and still left adequate, if not perfect, alternative means of communication." The Court of Appeals affirmed the lower courts ruling, adding that Hill v. Colorado had already affirmed a similar statute in Colorado. On March 25, 2013, McCullen filed a petition for a writ of certiorari with the Supreme Court, and on June 24, 2013 the petition was granted. The case was argued on January 15, 2014.

During oral arguments opponents of the law argued that the exemption for employees creates an unconstitutional imbalance in speech. Presenting McCullen as a peaceful counselor who "gently and lovingly" approached women to convince them not to have abortion and presented them with tiny knitted caps, prosecutors argued that her anti-abortion speech was limited while that of clinic supporters was not. Jennifer Miller, who argued the case for Massachusetts, claimed that the restrictions on speech were warranted to prevent violence or disruption outside the clinics. On June 26, 2014 the Supreme Court unanimously ruled that the buffer zone was an unconstitutional infringement on the First Amendment because it blocked peaceful protest on public streets.

See also 

 Anti-abortion violence

References

Doan, Alesha. Opposition and intimidation: The abortion wars and strategies of political harassment. University of Michigan Press, 2009, 1-13.
Joseph Scheidler, Closed: 99 Ways to Stop Abortion, 15-16, http://prolifeaction.org/about/closed01.php
Ibid, 15-21.
Anne Shaw and Alane Spinney, “Rhetoric, Repetition, and Violence: A Case Study of Clinic Conflict in Milwaukee,” College Literature, Vol. 26, No. 1, Cultural Violence (Winter, 1999), pp. 170–192.

http://www.prochoice.org/documents/Legal_Remedies.pdf

Hill v. Colorado, 530 U.S. 703, 735 (SCOTUS 2000)

Ibid, 2.
https://www.supremecourt.gov/oral_arguments/argument_transcripts/12-1168_8nk0.pdf

Anti-abortion movement
Reproductive coercion
Harassment
Protests by issue